Conger Mountain is a mountain in Millard County, Utah.  It is located 60 miles west of Delta, Utah.

Wildlife 
Conger Mountain is almost completely undeveloped. It serves as a habitat for mule deer and antelope and is home to a herd of wild horses. It is considered a vital habitat for the golden eagle and bald eagles have been spotted near the mountain. Conger Mountain is also home to ferruginous hawks, Swainson's hawks, mountain bluebird, red-tailed hawks, prairie falcons, kit foxes, badgers, and chukar.

Protection status 
Currently, the 20,400 acres encompassing Conger Mountain are considered a Wilderness Study Area.  Action may be taken in the future to designate this area as a National Wilderness Area.

References

External links
 
 

Mountains of Utah
Mountains of Millard County, Utah